Kavanagh or Kavanaugh is a surname of Irish origin, Caomhánach in Irish. It is properly Mac Murchadha Caomhánach (an example of an Irish agnomen; see Ó Catharnaigh Sionnach or Fox of Fir Teathbha), but is often now rendered 'Caomhánach' or rarely 'Ó Caomhánaigh'.

Origin and history

"Kavanagh" and "Kavanaugh" are anglicised variations of the Irish surname Caomhánach (Cʌoṁʌ̃nʌċ in traditional Gaelic script). The surname was first assumed by Domhnall Caomhánach (the eldest son of the 12th-century king of Leinster, Diarmait Mac Murchada) in Ireland. A considerable number of anglicised variations of Caomhánach exist, with some of the most common being: "Kavanagh", "Cavanagh", "Kavanaugh" and "Cavanaugh".

The surname was possibly adopted by Síl Fáelchán clansmen in preference to the earlier name MacMurrough, given the prestige associated with the dynamic junior line that seized the chiefship of the Uí Cheinnselaig tribal group in the High Middle Ages.

Notable people surnamed Kavanagh or Kavanaugh

Anthony Kavanagh (born 1969), Canadian Québécois comedian
Art mac Art MacMurrough-Kavanagh (1357–1417), Irish king of Leinster
Arthur MacMorrough Kavanagh (1831–1889), Irish politician from County Carlow
Brad Kavanagh (born 1992), British actor and singer-songwriter
Brendan Kavanagh, British pianist
Brett Kavanaugh (born 1965), American jurist; United States Supreme Court Justice since 2018
Brian Kavanagh (filmmaker) (born 1935), Australian writer and filmmaker
Brian Kavanagh (Gaelic footballer), Gaelic football player
Brian P. Kavanagh (born 1967), member of the New York State Assembly
Cahir Mac Art Kavanagh (died 1554), Irish magnate
Chanel Kavanagh (born 1995), judoka from New Zealand
Charles Kavanagh (1864–1950), British Army officer  
 Chris Kavanagh (musician) (born 1964), British drummer
 Chris Kavanagh (referee), British football referee
Daryl Kavanagh (born 1986), Irish soccer player
Dennis Kavanagh (born 1941), British political analyst and professor of politics
Derek Kavanagh (born 1980), Irish Gaelic football player
Dermot McMorrough Kavanagh (1890–1958), Crown Equerry of the Royal Household of the UK 1941–55
Donal Kavanagh (born 1950), Irish Gaelic footballer
Edward Kavanagh (1795–1844), American politician from Maine; US representative 1831–35; governor of Maine 1843–44
Edward J Kavanagh (1888–1960), New Zealand rugby union and cricket player 
Ernest Kavanagh (1884–1916), Irish cartoonist killed during the 1916 Easter Rising
Fergus Kavanagh (born 1985), Irish Olympic field hockey player
Frederick W. Kavanaugh (1871–1940), New York politician
Gary Kavanagh (contemporary), Irish Gaelic football player
George W. Kavanagh (1880–1914), New York assemblyman
Gerard Kavanagh (1970?-2014), Irish member of the Kinahan crime cartel
Gere Kavanaugh (born 1929), American designer
Graham Kavanagh (born 1973), Irish soccer player
Herminie Templeton Kavanagh (1861–1933), Irish-American short-story writer
Jack Kavanagh (politician) (1879–1964), Canadian-Australian communist politician
James Kavanaugh (1928–2009), American priest, author, and poet
James B. Kavanagh (1800–1886), Irish priest
Jamie Kavanagh (born 1990), Irish boxer
John Kavanagh (disambiguation), multiple people
Joseph Malachy Kavanagh (1856–1918), Irish painter
Julia Kavanagh (1824–1877), Irish novelist
Karen Kavanagh, Canadian physicist
Ken Kavanagh (1923–2019), Australian motorcycle road racer
Ken Kavanaugh (1916–2007), American football player and coach
Laurence Kavanagh (1764–1830), Canadian merchant, judge, and politician from Nova Scotia
Leo Kavanagh (1894–1950), American baseball player
Liam Kavanagh (1935–2021), Irish politician; TD for Wicklow 1969–97; former member of the European Parliament
Linda Kavanagh (c.1957–2003), Irish politician; member of the Dublin City Council
Mark Kavanagh (born 1997), Irish hurler
Markella Kavenagh, Australian actress
 Martin Kavanagh (historian) (1895–1987), Canadian teacher and historian
 Martin Kavanagh (hurler) (born 1994), Irish hurler
Marty Kavanagh (1891–1960), American baseball player
Michael Kavanagh (born 1979), Irish hurler
Morgan Kavanagh (c. 1799–1874), Irish poet, novelist and author of works on philology
Niamh Kavanagh (born 1968), Irish pop singer; Eurovision Song Contest winner 1993
P. J. Kavanagh (1931–2015), British poet and broadcaster
Paul Kavanagh (disambiguation)
Pat Kavanagh (agent) (1940–2008), British literary agent
Pat Kavanagh (ice hockey) (born 1979), Canadian ice hockey player
Patrick Kavanagh (1904–1967), Irish poet
Patrick Kavanagh (footballer, born 1985) (born 1985), Irish soccer player
Peter Kavanagh (Australian politician) (born 1959), Australian politician from Victoria
Peter Kavanagh (Irish footballer) (1910–1993), Irish football player
Peter Kavanagh (writer) (1916–2006), Irish writer and scholar; brother of the poet Patrick Kavanagh
Richie Kavanagh (born 1949), Irish entertainer and singer
Rory Kavanagh (born 1982), Irish Gaelic football player
Ryan Kavanaugh (born 1974), American film producer
Stephen Kavanagh, British retired senior police officer
Steve Kavanagh (born 1971), Canadian figure skater and ice dancer
Ted Kavanagh (1892–1958), British radio scriptwriter and producer
Terry Kavanagh (contemporary), American comic book writer and editor
Thomas Christian Kavanagh (1912–1978), American civil engineer; founding member of the National Academy of Engineering
Thomas G. Kavanagh (1917–1997), American jurist from Michigan; justice of the Michigan Supreme Court 1969–1985
Thomas Henry Kavanagh (1821–1882), Irish recipient of the Victoria Cross for action during the Indian Mutiny
Thomas M. Kavanagh (1909–1975), American jurist from Michigan; justice of the Michigan Supreme Court 1958–1975
Trevor Kavanagh (born 1943), British newspaper journalist and editor
Walter Kavanagh (cricketer) (1814–1836), Irish cricketer
Walter J. Kavanaugh (1933–2008), American politician from New Jersey; state legislator 1976–2008
William Marmaduke Kavanaugh (1866–1915), American politician from Arkansas; US senator 1913

Fictional characters 
Dominic Kavanagh, on the Irish soap opera Fair City
James Kavanagh, subject of British legal drama Kavanagh QC
Jon Kavanaugh, from the FX television series The Shield
Katherine 'Kate' Kavanagh, from the E. L. James novel Fifty Shades of Grey
Peter Kavanagh, on Stargate Atlantis
Tiffany Kavanagh, in The Missing Link DLC for the video game Deus Ex: Human Revolution
Toby Cavanaugh, from the series Pretty Little Liars
Tracy Kavanagh, on the Irish soap opera Fair City

See also
Cavanagh
Kings of Leinster
Uí Ceinnselaig

References

English-language surnames
Surnames of Irish origin
MacMorrough Kavanagh dynasty

de:Kavanagh
fr:Kavanagh